HMS Postillion was a reciprocating engine-powered  during the Second World War. She was ordered for the United States Navy as USS AM 335, but was transferred on completion under Lend-Lease to the Royal Navy as Postillion. She survived the war and was returned to the USN, being sold to the Greek Navy in 1947.

Design and description
The ships' complement consisted of 85 officers and ratings.

The reciprocating ships had two vertical triple-expansion steam engines, each driving one shaft, using steam provided by two Admiralty three-drum boilers.

The Algerine class was armed with a QF  Mk V anti-aircraft gun and four twin-gun mounts for Oerlikon 20 mm cannon. The latter guns were in short supply when the first ships were being completed and they often got a proportion of single mounts. By 1944, single-barrel Bofors 40 mm mounts began replacing the twin 20 mm mounts on a one for one basis. All of the ships were fitted for four throwers and two rails for depth charges.

Construction and career
The ship was put on order for the United States Navy in December 1941 at the Toronto Shipbuilding Company. She was laid down on 17 November 1942  as AM 335, launched on 18 March 1943 and completed 25 November the same year. At that point the USN had little need for her, and she was transferred to the Royal Navy under the Lend-Lease arrangement, being commissioned into the Royal Navy on 25 November 1943 as HMS Postillion.

After war service she was returned to the USN in December 1946, and was sold to the Greek Navy in 1947 as Machitis. She was finally used as a target and sunk off Crete in 1984.

War Service 

 HX-276 (Departed New York City, 22 January 1944, arrived Liverpool, 7 February 1944 - ESCORT 27/01 - 06/02)
 OS-120/ KMS-94 (Depart Clyde & Downs, 1 April 1945, Convoy Split 7 April 1945 - ESCORT 03/04 - 05/04)

References

Bibliography
 
 
 Peter Elliott (1977) Allied Escort Ships of World War II. MacDonald & Janes,

External links
 HMS Postillion at uboat.net

 

Algerine-class minesweepers of the Royal Navy
Ships built in Ontario
1943 ships
World War II minesweepers of the United Kingdom
Shipwrecks in the Mediterranean Sea
Ships sunk as targets
Maritime incidents in 1984